Catford Bridge railway station is on the Mid-Kent Line, serving Hayes line trains from London to Hayes. It is adjacent to (and on a lower level than) Catford railway station (from which it is separated by the former Catford Stadium site) on the Catford Loop line. The station entrance is on Catford Road, a part of the South Circular Road (A205), and has brick buildings on both platforms, though the up side building is no longer in use by the railway. The station is managed by Southeastern, who operate all trains serving it.

History

Early years (1857-1922)

The Mid Kent line was built by the Mid-Kent and North Kent Junction Railway (MK&NKJR) and was opened on 1 January 1857 as far as Beckenham Junction (although it was not technically a junction as the West End of London and Crystal Palace Railway's line did not open until 3 May 1858).

From opening the line was worked by the South Eastern Railway (SER). On opening Catford Bridge was provided with a small goods yard on the up side north of the platform.

Seven years later the MK&NKJR built an extension from a new junction station at New Beckenham to Croydon (Addiscombe Road) which again was operated by the SER.

Almost all services from the station have terminated at Charing Cross or Cannon Street stations but between 1880 and 1884 a service worked between Croydon (Addiscombe Road) calling all stations to New Cross and then via a connection to the East London Line and terminating at Liverpool Street station.

In 1898 the South Eastern Railway and its bitter rivals the London Chatham and Dover Railway agreed to work as one railway company under the name of the South Eastern and Chatham Railway and Catford Bridge became an SECR station.

Southern Railway (1923-1947)

Following the Railways Act 1921 (also known as the Grouping Act), Catford Bridge became a Southern Railway station on 1 January 1923.

The Mid-Kent line was electrified with the (750 V DC) third rail system and electric services commenced on 28 February 1926.  Early electric services were worked by early Southern Railway 3-car Electric Multiple Unit trains often built from old SECR carriages.

Between 1927 and 1935 speculative house building west of the station saw an increase in commuter numbers.

British Railways (1948-1994)
After World War II and following nationalisation on 1 January 1948, the station fell under the auspices of British Railways Southern Region.

The goods yard closed to general traffic on 28 December 1964 and to coal on 25 March 1968.
Colour light signalling was introduced between Ladywell and New Beckenham on 4 April 1971 with signalling being controlled by the signal box at New Beckenham. The small SER signal box which was located on the up platform was closed as a result. On 28 September 1975 the control of the signalling was transferred to London Bridge signalling centre.

In May 1993 the up (towards London) side ticket office was destroyed by fire and following this a new ticket office was opened on the down side of the station.

The privatisation era (1994–present day)
On 13 October 1996 operation of the passenger services passed to Connex South Eastern. Services were subsequently operated by South Eastern Trains, and Southeastern since 1 April 2006.

Services

The typical off-peak service in trains per hour is:
 4 tph to 

On Sundays, the station is served by a half-hourly service between Hayes and London Charing Cross via Lewisham.

Connections
London Buses routes 75, 124, 160, 171, 181, 185, 202, 284, 320, 336 and night route N171 serve the station.

In the media
The second episode of the 1979 London Weekend Television comedy series End of Part One includes the main characters watching a film called "The Life of Christopher Columbus". In the film, Columbus goes to a tube station and asks for a train to America, but is told he can only go as far as Catford. Part of a modified tube map is shown which shows the fictitious tube stations Lewisham, Ladywell, Edge of the World and Catford on the East London Section of the Metropolitan line south from New Cross station. There is an actual part of the main line Mid-Kent Railway that interchanges with New Cross station, and the stations are, southwards in order: St. John's, Lewisham, Ladywell and Catford Bridge.

References

Notes

External links

Railway stations in the London Borough of Lewisham
Former South Eastern Railway (UK) stations
Railway stations in Great Britain opened in 1857
Railway stations served by Southeastern
Catford
1857 establishments in England